All Hits is the first greatest hits album by All Saints released in 2001 following the group's split. It also features a song by Melanie Blatt and Artful Dodger called "TwentyFourSeven".

Track listing

Charts and certifications

Weekly charts

Certifications

References

External links
 Official site

2001 greatest hits albums
All Saints (group) compilation albums
London Records albums